The Great Ordovician Biodiversification Event (GOBE), was an evolutionary radiation of animal life throughout the Ordovician period, 40 million years after the Cambrian explosion, whereby the distinctive Cambrian fauna fizzled out to be replaced with a Paleozoic fauna rich in suspension feeder and pelagic animals.

It followed a series of Cambrian–Ordovician extinction events, and the resulting fauna went on to dominate the Palaeozoic relatively unchanged.
Marine diversity increased to levels typical of the Palaeozoic, and morphological disparity was similar to today's.
The diversity increase was neither global nor instantaneous; it happened at different times in different places.  Consequently, there is unlikely to be a simple or straightforward explanation for the event; the interplay of many geological and ecological factors likely produced the diversification.

Causes

Possible causes include changes in palaeogeography or tectonic activity, a modified nutrient supply, or global cooling. The dispersed positions of the continents, high level of tectonic/volcanic activity, warm climate, and high CO2 levels would have created a large, nutrient-rich ecospace, favoring diversification. There seems to be an association between orogeny and the evolutionary radiation, with the Taconic orogeny in particular being singled out as a driver of the GOBE by enabling greater erosion of nutrients such as iron and phosphorus and their delivery to the oceans around Laurentia. In addition, the changing geography led to a more diverse landscape, with more different and isolated environments; this no doubt facilitated the emergence of bioprovinciality, and speciation by isolation of populations. On the other hand, global cooling has also been offered as a cause of the radiation, with an uptick in fossil diversity correlating with the increasing abundance of cool-water carbonates over the course of this time interval. Another alternative is that the breakup of an asteroid led to the Earth being consistently pummelled by meteorites, although the proposed Ordovician meteor event happened at 467.5±0.28 million years ago. Another effect of a collision between two asteroids, possibly beyond the orbit of Mars, is a reduction in sunlight reaching the Earth's surface due to the vast dust clouds created. Evidence for this geological event comes from the relative abundance of the isotope helium-3, found in ocean sediments laid down at the time of the biodiversification event. The most likely cause of the production of high levels of helium-3 is the bombardment of lithium by cosmic rays, something which could only have happened to material which travelled through space. The volcanic activity that created the Flat Landing Brook Formation in New Brunswick, Canada may have caused rapid climatic cooling and biodiversification.

The above triggers would have been amplified by ecological escalation, whereby any new species would co-evolve with others, creating new niches through niche partitioning, trophic layering, or by providing a new habitat.  As with the Cambrian Explosion, it is likely that environmental changes drove the diversification of plankton, which permitted an increase in diversity and abundance of plankton-feeding lifeforms, including suspension feeders on the sea floor, and nektonic organisms in the water column. After the SPICE event about 500 million years ago, the extinction in the ocean would have opened up new niches for photosynthetic plankton, who would absorb CO2 from the atmosphere and release large amount of oxygen. More oxygen and a more diversified photosynthetic plankton as the bottom of the food chain, would have affected the diversity of higher marine organisms and their ecosystems.

Effects

If the Cambrian Explosion is thought of as producing the modern phyla, the GOBE can be considered as the "filling out" of these phyla with the modern (and many extinct) classes and lower-level taxa. The GOBE is considered to be one of the most potent speciation events of the Phanerozoic era increasing global diversity severalfold. 

Notable taxonomic diversity explosions during this period include that of articulated brachiopods, gastropods and bivalves.

Taxonomic diversity increased manifold; the total number of marine orders doubled, and families tripled.  
In addition to a diversification, the event also marked an increase in the complexity of both organisms and food webs. Taxa began to have localized ranges, with different faunas at different parts of the globe.  Communities in reefs and deeper water began to take on a character of their own, becoming more clearly distinct from other marine ecosystems.  And as ecosystems became more diverse, with more species being squeezed into the food web, a more complex tangle of ecological interactions resulted, promoting strategies such as ecological tiering.
The global fauna that emerged during the GOBE went on to be remarkably stable until the catastrophic end-Permian extinction and the ensuing Mesozoic Marine Revolution.

The acritarch record (the majority of acritarchs were probably marine algae) displays the Ordovician radiation beautifully; both diversity and disparity peaked in the middle Ordovician.  The warm waters and high sea level (which had been rising steadily since the early Cambrian) permitted large numbers of phytoplankton to prosper; the accompanying diversification of the phytoplankton may have caused an accompanying radiation of zooplankton and suspension feeders.

The planktonic realm was invaded as never before, with several invertebrate lineages colonising the open waters and initiating new food chains at the end of the Cambrian into the early Ordovician.

See also

 Avalon Explosion
 Cambrian Explosion
 Carboniferous-Earliest Permian Biodiversification Event
 Mesozoic–Cenozoic Radiation
 Mesozoic Marine Revolution
 Evolutionary fauna

References

Ordovician events
Darriwilian
Events in the geological history of Earth